Phasmatini is a tribe of stick insects in the family Phasmatidae. There are more than 40 described species, found in  Australasia, Asia and possibly Brazil.

Genera
These genera belong to the tribe Phasmatini:
 Acrophylla Gray, 1835
 Anchiale Stål, 1875
 Cigarrophasma Brock & Hasenpusch, 2001 (monotypic Cigarrophasma  tessellatum)
 Ctenomorpha Gray, 1833
 Dryococelus Gurney, 1947 (monotypic)
 Eurycnema Serville, 1838
 Onchestus Stål, 1877
 Paractenomorpha Hennemann & Conle, 2004 (monotypic Paractenomorpha baehri)
 Paracyphocrania Redtenbacher, 1908
 Paronchestus Redtenbacher, 1908
 Peloriana Uvarov, 1940 (monotypic Peloriana lobiceps)
 Phasma Lichtenstein, 1796

References

Further reading

 
 

Phasmatodea
Phasmatodea tribes